Lauren Ewing (born 1946) is an American sculptor and installation artist.

Ewing grew up in Indiana and earned her Master of Fine Arts degree from Indiana State University (ISU) in 1971. While at ISU, Ewing was influenced by professor Robert Bastian, who worked with and wrote about architectural typology. She has said she is inspired by the social memory of communities, which provide "a wider reading of our culture." Ewing is a former head of the Rhode Island School of Design Department of Sculpture and taught sculpture at Rutgers University for 32 years.

Her work is included in the collections of the Museum of Modern Art, New York, the Metropolitan Museum of Art and the Brooklyn Museum.

References

20th-century American women artists
Living people
1946 births
21st-century American women